Urgleptes ozophagus is a species of beetle in the family Cerambycidae. It was described by Chemsak and Feller in 1988.

References

Urgleptes
Beetles described in 1988